The Chartered Accountants Act, 1949 is a statute enacted by the Constituent Assembly of India, which was acting as the provisional Parliament of India in 1949 to regulate the profession of Chartered Accountants in India. Under this act, The Institute of Chartered Accountants of India was established to educate, register and regulate Chartered Accountants in India. The Act provides for qualifications, elections for central as well as regional councils, penalties for misconduct by Chartered Accountants.

References

External links
 Act No. 38 of 1949
 Informative Website & Training institute – AJ Education NeXt

Acts of the Parliament of India 1949
Accounting in India